Sirpi Balasubramaniam (born 29 July 1936) is a Tamil poet, critic, scholar and professor from Tamil Nadu, India.

Biography
Balasubramaniam was born in Aaththupollachi village in Pollachi Coimbatore District. He obtained his MA from Annamalai University and PhD from Madras University. He worked as a lecturer in NGM college, Pollachi. He then became a Professor at the Tamil department of Bharathiar University. He eventually became the head of the Department. He was a founding member of the Vanambadi literary movement in the 1970s. He edited the movement's flagship journal of the same name and also another literary magazine called Annam vidu thoothu. He has published more than a dozen works of poetry and literary criticism in his literary career. In 2003, he was awarded the Sahitya Akademi Award for Tamil for his poetry collection Oru Giraamattu Nadhi  (lit. River in a Hamlet ). He had earlier won the Sahitya Akademi Translation Prize in 2001 for his translation of Lalithambika Antharjanam's Agnisakshi into Tamil. He is the current convener of the Akademi's Tamil advisory board.

The English translation of his poem collection Poojiyangalin Sangili is published by Jayanthasri Balakrishnan as The Chain of Absolutes.

Awards and recognitions

Bharathidasan award (1987)
Government of Tamil Nadu award
Tamil University award
Sahitya Akademi Award for translation (2001)
Sahitya Akademi Award for Tamil (2003)
Rajah Sir Muthiah Chettiar Birthday Commemoration Award (2006)
Lifetime Literature Achievement Award - (Puthiyathalaimurai Tamilan Awards 2018)
 Padmashri Award (Government of India)(2022)

Partial bibliography

Poetry
ilanthamizhae(1963)
Nilakokru (1963)
Siritha muthukkal (1968)
Sarapa Yagam (1976)
Mounamayakkangal (1982)
Sooriya nizhal (1990)
Irahu (1996)
Margazhip paavai (2010)
Poojayangalin Sangili
Bharathi Kaithi En 203

Literary criticism
Ilakkiya chinthanai (1989)
A Comparative study of Bharathi and Vallathol
Sirpiyin katturaikal (1996)
Ramalinga vallalirin arutpa thirattu (2001)

References

Translating the pains of Endosulfan Victims B.Meenakshi Sundaram http://epaper.newindianexpress.com/c/2035204
Lifetime Literature Achievement Award(Puthiyathalaimurai Tamilan Awards 2018) - http://www.puthiyathalaimurai.com/news/special-news/50385-puthiyathalaimurai-tamilan-awards-2018.html

Living people
Poets from Tamil Nadu
20th-century Indian translators
Recipients of the Sahitya Akademi Award in Tamil
Tamil writers
1936 births
Annamalai University alumni
Indian Tamil people
20th-century Indian poets
Indian literary critics
People from Coimbatore district
Recipients of the Sahitya Akademi Prize for Translation